Thangjing Temple (Thangching Temple)(), also known as Ibudhou Thangjing Temple (Iputhou Thangching Temple) or Ebudhou Thangjing Temple (Eputhou Thangching Temple), is a grand ancient temple dedicated to God Thangjing, the ancient national deity of ancient Moirang (in modern day Moirang). The best time to visit the temple is from May to July during the onset of the traditional music and dance religious festival of Lai Haraoba. It attracts many tourists every year, including historians and archaeologists.

The temple is the place where the Khamba Thoibi Jagoi was performed for the first time according to legends.

See also
 Hiyangthang Lairembi Temple
 Sanamahi Temple
 Sanamahi Kiyong Temple

References

Ancient archaeological sites
Ancient culture 
Archaeological monuments in India
Archaeological sites in India
Landmarks in India 
Meitei architecture
Meitei pilgrimage sites
Moirang
Monuments and memorials in Manipur 
Monuments and memorials to Meitei people
Religious places
Tourist attractions in Manipur
Temples in India